The discography of Britt Nicole, an American Christian pop singer-songwriter, consists of five studio albums, three extended plays, eleven singles, three promotional singles, five music videos and three album appearances. On May 22, 2007, she released her second album Say It, which peaked at No. 4 on Hot Christian Albums. The debut single from the album, "You", was released on March 27, 2007, and reached the Top 10 on Hot Christian Songs. The second single, "Sunshine Girl", was featured on MTV's teen reality show Newport Harbor: The Real Orange County. Nicole's first music video, for the song "Believe", premiered on the Gospel Music Channel on September 22, 2007. "Set the World On Fire" was released as third single.

The third album, The Lost Get Found, was released on August 11, 2009, and peaked No. 1 on Hot Christian Albums. The same month, a music video for her song "Holiday" surfaced on the internet. Her second single, "Walk on The Water", peaked No. 17 on the Hot Christian Songs. Overseas, the song "Headphones" was promoted as her second single in the United Kingdom. On March 26, 2012, she released her fourth album, Gold. The album debuted at No. 1 on the Hot Christian Albums and 41 on the Billboard 200. The singles "Stand" and "Breakthrough" were released to United States and United Kingdom Christian radio, respectively, in the fall of 2012. The former peaked at No. 11 on U.S. Christian contemporary hit radio and the latter peaked at No. 3 on UK Christian radio. In December 2012, she released two Christmas music videos, "Jingle Bell Rock" and "O Holy Night". Britt Nicole is co-signed to Capitol Records and released "Gold" as her debut mainstream single on December 4, 2012. The following year Gold was re-released as a mainstream album. In March 2015, she released a full-length remix album, The Remixes. On October 7, 2016, she released her fifth studio album, Britt Nicole.

Albums

Studio albums

Compilation albums

Extended plays

Singles

As lead artist

As featured artist

Promotional singles

Other charted songs

Other appearances

Music videos

Notes
A: as Brittany Waddell

References

Discographies of American artists
Pop music discographies
Christian music discographies